B. Jayashree (born 9 June 1950) is a veteran Indian theatre actress, director and singer, who has also acted in films and television and worked as dubbing artist in films. She is the creative director of Spandana Theatre, an amateur theatre company based in Bangalore, established in 1976.

She was nominated to the Upper house of the Indian Parliament, Rajya Sabha in 2010. She was awarded the Padma Shri, fourth-highest civilian honour by Government of India in 2013.

Her grandfather was noted theatre director, Gubbi Veeranna, who founded the Gubbi Veeranna Nataka Company.

Early life and background

She was born in Bangalore to  G.V. Malathamma who was the daughter of Gubbi Veeranna, and later graduated from the National School of Drama, Delhi in 1973, where she trained under noted theatre director and teacher Ebrahim Alkazi.

Career

Over the years, she has worked with notable theatre personalities, including B. V. Karanth. She has acted in Kannada films, like Nagamandala (1997), Deveeri (1999) and Care of Footpath (2006). She has also briefly remained the director of Mysore-based theatre institute, Rangayana.

She was a voice-over artist for Madhavi, Gayathri, Jaya Prada, Ambika , Sumalatha and many other actresses in Rajkumar movies. As a playback singer she has performed in Kannada cinema, including the hit number "Car Car" for Kannada film, Nanna Preethiya Hudugi.

In 1996, she was awarded the Sangeet Natak Akademi Award for acting, given by the Sangeet Natak Akademi, India's National Academy of Music, Dance & Drama, and the highest Indian recognition given to practicing artists, and later she was nominated to the Rajya Sabha in 2010. She has also received an honorary D. Litt degree from the Karnataka State Open University in 2009.

Personal life
She married K. Ananda Raju and the couple has 2 adopted daughters along with her biological daughter Sushma Veer.

Filmography

As actress
Emme Thammanna (1966)
Bhale Adrushtavo Adrushta(1971)
 Devaru Kotta Vara (1976)
 Jeevana Chakra (1985)
 Ee Bandha Anubandha (1987)
 Sundara Swapnagalu (1987)
 Malgudi Days (1987)
 Kotreshi Kanasu (1994)
 Nagamandala (1997)
 Deveeri (1999)
 Kadamba (2003)
 Durgi (2004)
 Care of Footpath (2006)
 Ee Preethi Yeke Bhoomi Melide (2007)
 Banada Neralu (2009)
 Ishtakamya (2016) 
 Kiragoorina Gayyaligalu (2016)
 Maasthi Gudi (2017)
  Mookajjiya Kanasugalu (2019)

As dubbing artist

As playback singer
 Naga Devathe (2000) - Haalundu Hoge
 Kothigalu Saar Kothigalu(2001) - Bondana Dummina
 Durgi (2004) - Bilthave Nodeega
 Nanna Preethiya Hudugi(2001) - Car Car
 Preethi Prema Pranaya (2003) - Kabbina Jalle
 Bhagawan (2004) - Gopalappa
 Jogi (2005) - Chikku Bukku Rail
 Mata (2006) - Thandaa Thaayee
 Maathaad Maathaadu Mallige (2007) - Baaro Nam Therige

References

External links

Spandana Theatre, website

1950 births
Living people
Actresses from Bangalore
Indian stage actresses
National School of Drama alumni
Kannada playback singers
Nominated members of the Rajya Sabha
Recipients of the Padma Shri in arts
Indian theatre directors
Recipients of the Sangeet Natak Akademi Award
Actresses in Kannada cinema
Indian film actresses
Rajya Sabha members from Karnataka
Politicians from Bangalore
Indian actor-politicians
Actresses in Kannada theatre
20th-century Indian actresses
21st-century Indian actresses
20th-century Indian singers
20th-century Indian women politicians
20th-century Indian politicians
21st-century Indian women politicians
21st-century Indian politicians
Indian women playback singers
Singers from Bangalore
20th-century Indian women singers
21st-century Indian women singers
21st-century Indian singers
Women musicians from Karnataka
Women members of the Rajya Sabha